Finland was present at the Eurovision Song Contest 1985, held in Gothenburg, Sweden. The Finnish entry was "Eläköön elämä", performed by Sonja Lumme and composed by Petri Laaksonen and Veli-Pekka Lehto.

Before Eurovision

National final 
The final was held at the YLE TV studios in Helsinki, hosted by Seppo Hovi. The votes of 6 regional juries decided the winner.

At Eurovision
Lumme performed 2nd on the night of the contest, following Ireland and preceding Cyprus. At the close of the voting it had received 56 points, placing 9th of 19.

Voting

References

External links
Finnish National Final 1985

1985
Countries in the Eurovision Song Contest 1985
Eurovision